= Modular optoelectronic multispectral scanner =

The modular optoelectronic multispectral scanner (MOMS) is a scanning system for spaceborne, geoscientific remote sensing applications used in satellite navigation systems for sensing atmospheric and oceanic systems. The scanner is combination of separate spectrometer blocks.

== History ==
The modular optoelectronic multispectral scanner is an optical technology programme funded by the German Ministry for Research and Technology. It was jointly designed and developed by DLR, LMU and EADS Astrium.

== Characteristics ==
The modular structure of MOMS makes it suitable for use in wide variety of geo-spatial missions, the modules being sensor, optical lens, electronics and filters. The first flight of MOMS yielded high-resolution images with 20x20 m ground pixel size from about 300 km orbital altitude.

=== MOMS-01 ===
MOMS01 consists of five instruments mounted on a carbon-fiber structure:

- The optical module with four objectives, eight arrays, and associated shutters. Each module represents one spectral band, consisted of filters, dual-lens optics, four CCD detector line-scanning arrays, and preamplifier electronics.
- A power box for overall power control.
- A logic box for all sensor function control (including real-time correction, and formatting of the source data stream from the optical module)
- A HDDT (high-density digital tape) recorder.
- A pressurized container for the recording system.

MOMS-01 is a two-channel system working in 575–625 nm for general surface imagery and 825–975 nm for vegetation detection.

=== MOMS-02 ===
MOMS-02 is an upgraded version of MOMS-01. Its objectives are:

- Stereoscopic visual observation.
- Mapping of digital terrain models with < 5 m of ground pixel size.
- Testing the digital photogrammetric observation technique and processing system.
- Correlation of high-resolution panchromatic data with multispectral data.

== Development ==
The development of MOMS was overseen by DLR(German Aerospace Center). Following are the team members involved in development of the MOMS:

- German Aerospace Center
- University of Stuttgart
- German National Research Centre or GFZ (GeoForschungsZentrum).

== Uses ==
The modular optoelectronic multispectral scanner usage can be employed in the following applications or related projects

- Geological mapping of surfaces.
- GeoScientific missions.
- Mineral resources exploration
- Hydrology
- Oceanography
- Coastal zone mapping
- Topographic mapping

== Mission ==
The first two flights of MOMS-01 took place on board the Space Shuttle missions STS-7 and STS-11 in 1983 and 1984, respectively.
